"I Promise to Remember" is a song written by Jimmy Castor and Jimmy Smith and performed by Frankie Lymon and The Teenagers featuring Jimmy Wright and His Orchestra. It reached #10 on the US R&B chart and #57 on the Billboard pop chart in 1956. The song was featured on their 1956 album, The Teenagers Featuring Frankie Lymon.

The single's B-side, "Who Can Explain?", reached #7 on the US R&B chart.

Other versions
The Jimmy Castor Bunch released a version of the song as the B-side to their 1972 single "Troglodyte (Cave Man)".  It was featured on their album, It's Just Begun.

References

1956 songs
1956 singles
The Teenagers songs
Gee Records singles